Papá por un día (Spanish: Dad for a Day) is a 2009 Argentine sports romantic comedy film starring Nicolás Cabré, Luisana Lopilato and Gimena Accardi. It was premiered on 6 August 2009, and was also screened at the Mar del Plata Film Festival on 14 November 2009, not as the part of the competition.

Plot 
Federico Villaverde (Nicolás Cabré) is the coach of the female hockey team of a very high-level club. He is engaged to Cecilia (Gimena Accardi), one of the players and the daughter of Luciano Ayerza (Boy Olmi), the owner of the club; when his dying father (Gustavo Garzón), whom he had not seen in ten years, asks him to take care of Tini (Julieta Poggio) his 8-year-old sister, whom he has never met before, things get upside down for him as he tries to adjust this new life. Amidst this situation he meets Julieta (Luisana Lopilato), the captain of the hockey team his father used to coach, and unexpected feelings arise.

Cast 
 Nicolás Cabré as Federico Villaverde
 Luisana Lopilato as Julieta Miriotti	
 Gimena Accardi as Cecilia Ayerza
 Gustavo Garzón as Eliseo Villaverde
 Gogó Andreu as Lorenzo
 Inés Palombo as Teresa
 Patricia Sosa as Beba
 Nicolás Vázquez as Taxi driver
 Julieta Poggio as Martina "Tini" Villaverde
 Boy Olmi as Luciano Ayerza
 Miguel Ángel Rodríguez as Tito Miriotti
 Joaquín Berthold as Mariano Alerce
 Martín Borisenko as Gonzalo de la Oz
 Mónica Gonzaga as María Inés
 Roberto Dolade as Doctor
 Carlos Kaspar as Kit manager
 Bárbara Diez as Wedding planner

Reception

Critical response 
The newspaper La Nación described the film as "Good", noting that "The plot achieves what it set out to do: to entertain with successful gags, funny dialogues and situations."

While the film critic Ezequiel Boetti from Escribiendo Cine rated it with a score of 4 out of 10, describing it as "a cinematic concoction that includes from sports competitions to the worst clichés in Argentine films.", "an ad infinitum concatenation of the worst things in local filmmaking." and negatively highlighted "the thick writing with which the scriptwriters portrayed the two female leads".

Also 4 out of 10 was the rating of Diego Battle from Otros Cines, who pointed out that "the script by Jorge Maestro is quite disappointing, inferior than -to name a few other works by its author- products like Pelito, La Banda del Golden Rocket or Montaña Rusa. In this very weak film stereotypes, caricatures, simplifications, superficial things and clichés abound. The plot is uninspired, there is not much grace, neither emotion, nor sensitivity, neither humanity nor audacity."

For its part, the newspaper Clarín described it as "Average".

Box office 
The film reached 480,568 viewers, reaching 20th place in the 2009 Argentine box office ranking. Dad for a Day grossed a total of $1.866.255 million.

References

External links 
  
 

2009 films
2000s sports comedy films
2000s Spanish-language films
2009 romantic comedy films
Argentine sports comedy films
Argentine romantic comedy films
2000s Argentine films